A penumbral lunar eclipse took place on Thursday, January 18, 1973, the first of four lunar eclipses in 1973, lasting almost 4 hours. At maximum eclipse, 86.555% of the Moon's disc was partially shaded by the Earth, which caused a slight shadow gradient across its disc; this subtle effect may have been visible to careful observers. No part of the Moon was in complete shadow. The eclipse lasted 3 hours, 56 minutes and 33.7 seconds overall. The Moon was only 2 days after perigee (Perigee on Tuesday, January 16, 1973), making it 3.9% larger than average. At greatest eclipse, the Moon's center was 365,613 km (227,181 mi) from the Earth's center, only 5,613 km (3,488 mi) to be a Super Full Moon.

Visibility
It was completely visible over North America, South America, the Atlantic Ocean, Europe, Africa, the Indian Ocean, Asia and Australia, seen rising over the Atlantic Ocean and setting over the western North Pacific Ocean.

Relation to other lunar eclipses

Eclipses in 1973 
 An annular solar eclipse on Thursday, 4 January 1973.
 A penumbral lunar eclipse on Thursday, 18 January 1973.
 A penumbral lunar eclipse on Friday, 15 June 1973.
 A total solar eclipse on Saturday, 30 June 1973.
 A penumbral lunar eclipse on Sunday, 15 July 1973.
 A partial lunar eclipse on Monday, 10 December 1973.
 An annular solar eclipse on Monday, 24 December 1973.

Lunar year series

Half-Saros cycle
A lunar eclipse will be preceded and followed by solar eclipses by 9 years and 5.5 days (a half saros). This lunar eclipse is related to two partial solar eclipses of Solar Saros 150.

See also
List of lunar eclipses
List of 20th-century lunar eclipses

Notes

External links

1973-01
1973 in science
January 1973 events